The Milton Keynes urban area or Milton Keynes Built-up Area is a designation established by the United Kingdom's Office for National Statistics.  Milton Keynes has no statutory boundary: the  1967 designated area only determined the area assigned to the Milton Keynes Development Corporation for development. The wider urban area outside that designation includes Newport Pagnell and Woburn Sands as well as Aspley Guise (Bedfordshire) and part of Stoke Hammond civil parish.

At the 2021 census, the population of Milton Keynes's Built-up Area was 256,385, an increase of 11.5% over the figure of 229,941 recorded at the 2011 census. That in turn was an increase of almost 25% on the population recorded in the 2001 census of 184,506.

Built-up area sub-divisions
These are the 'built-up area subdivisions'  of the Milton Keynes urban area (built-up area) as defined by the ONS.

2021
, information about the definitions and populations of the built-up area subdivisions of the 2021 census has yet to be released.

2011

2001
In defining the sub-areas of the Milton Keynes urban area for the 2001 census, the ONS used the pre-designation urban and rural districts, subdividing the larger rural district by the chronological phases of urbanisation within them). (These designations were largely dropped for the 2011 Census.) These were:
 Bletchley Urban District
 Wolverton Urban District
 Newport Pagnell Urban District
 Newport Pagnell Rural District
The Central and North Milton Keynes enumeration districts covered that part of the former Newport Pagnell Rural District that is west of the River Ouzel. The "Walnut Tree" and "Browns Wood" sub-areas together cover the remainder of the Rural District from the Ouzel to the M1. The areas covered by these names are far larger than the civil parishes of the same name, except for 'North Milton Keynes', which does not exist otherwise. (The precise boundary mapping is no longer available: the information in the notes below was derived at the time.) 
 
The corresponding 2001 Urban Sub-areas were:

At that time, Woburn Sands was not contiguous with the rest of the urban area and thus is not included. Its population was 4,963.

Notes

References

External links 
 A Vision of Britain - Milton Keynes.

Milton Keynes
Urban areas of England